The 2015 Louisiana–Monroe Warhawks softball team represents University of Louisiana at Monroe in the 2015 NCAA Division I softball season.  The Warhawks compete in the Sun Belt Conference and are led by first-year head coach Corey Lyon. ULM plays its home games at the ULM Softball Complex in Monroe, LA.

Roster

Schedule

! style="background:#660000;color:gold;"| Regular season
|- valign="top" 

|- style="background:#f2f2f2; font-weight:bold;"
|  colspan=7 style="background:#660000;color:gold;"| Lady Techsters Invitational (4–1)
|- bgcolor="#ccffcc"
| 1 || February 5 ||  || Lady Techster Softball Complex || 9–5 || 1–0 || —
|- align="center" bgcolor="#ffccc"
| 2 || February 6 ||  || Lady Techster Softball Complex || 4–7 || 1–1 || —
|- bgcolor="#ccffcc"
| 3 || February 6 ||  || Lady Techster Softball Complex || 8–2 || 2–1 || —
|- bgcolor="#ccffcc"
| 4 || February 7 ||  || Lady Techsters Softball Complex || 8–2 || 3–1 || —
|- bgcolor="#ccffcc"
| 5 || February 7 ||  || Lady Techsters Softball Complex || 4–3 || 4–1 || —
|- style="background:#f2f2f2; font-weight:bold;"
|  colspan=7 style="background:#660000;color:gold;"| Mardi Gras Classic (5–0)
|- bgcolor="#ccffcc"
| 6 || February 13 ||  || ULM Softball Complex || 10–2 || 5–1 || —
|- bgcolor="#ccffcc"
| 7 || February 13 ||  || ULM Softball Complex || 11–3 || 6–1 || —
|- bgcolor="#ccffcc"
| 8 || February 14 || Alabama State || ULM Softball Complex || 3–1 || 7–1 || —
|- bgcolor="#ccffcc"
| 9 || February 14 ||  || ULM Softball Complex || 8–0 || 8–1 || —
|- bgcolor="#ccffcc"
| 10 || February 15 || Grambling State || ULM Softball Complex || 10–2 || 9–1 || —
|- align="center" bgcolor="#ffccc"
| 11 || February 18 ||  || Lady Demon Diamond || 3–4 || 9–2 || —
|- bgcolor="#ccffcc"
| 12 || February 20 ||  || ULM Softball Complex || 7–5 || 10–2 || —
|- bgcolor="#ccffcc"
| 13 || February 20 || Delaware || ULM Softball Complex || 11–3 || 11–2 || —
|- style="background:#f2f2f2; font-weight:bold;"
|  colspan=7 style="background:#660000;color:gold;"| Central Arkansas Tournament (1–1)
|- bgcolor="#ffcccc"
| 14 || February 21 ||  || Farris Field || 0–8 || 11–3 || —
|- bgcolor="#ccffcc"
| 15 || February 21 || vs. Arkansas–Pine Bluff || Farris Field || 13–5 || 12–3 || —
|- align="center" bgcolor=""
| 16 || February 24 ||  || ULM Softball Complex || Canceled || 12–3 || —
|- style="background:#f2f2f2; font-weight:bold;"
|  colspan=7 style="background:#660000;color:gold;"| 2015 Alexis Park Resort Classic (2–3)
|- bgcolor="#ccffcc"
| 17 || February 27 ||  || Eller Media Stadium || 3–1 || 13–3 || —
|- align="center" bgcolor="#ffccc"
| 18 || February 27 ||  || Eller Media Stadium || 6–7 || 13–4 || —
|- bgcolor="#ccffcc"
| 19 || February 28 ||  || Eller Media Stadium || 9–8 || 14–4 || —
|- align="center" bgcolor="#ffccc"
| 20 || February 28 ||  || Eller Media Stadium || 1–2 || 14–5 || —
|-

|- bgcolor="#ffcccc"
| 21 || March 1 ||  || Eller Media Stadium || 2–4 || 14–6 || —
|- align="center" bgcolor=""
| 22 || March 4 || Louisiana Tech || ULM Softball Complex || Canceled || — || —
|- bgcolor="#ccffcc"
| 23 || March 7 ||  || ULM Softball Complex || 10–1 || 15–6 || 1–0
|- bgcolor="#ccffcc"
| 24 || March 7 || Appalachian State || ULM Softball Complex || 6–5 || 16–6 || 2–0
|- bgcolor="#ccffcc"
| 25 || March 8 || Appalachian State || ULM Softball Complex || 4–0 || 17–6 || 3–0
|- align="center" bgcolor=""
| 26 || March 11 ||  || ULM Softball Complex || Canceled || — || —
|- align="center" bgcolor=""
| 27 || March 11 || Incarnate Word || ULM Softball Complex || Canceled || — || —
|- bgcolor="#ccffcc"
| 28 || March 15 ||  || ULM Softball Complex || 8–0 || 18–6 || 4–0
|- bgcolor="#ffcccc"
| 29 || March 15 || #23 South Alabama || ULM Softball Complex || 0–2 || 18–7 || 4–1
|- align="center" bgcolor=""
| 31 || March 21 ||  || ULM Softball Complex || Canceled || — || —
|- bgcolor="#ffcccc"
| 32 || March 21 || Texas State || ULM Softball Complex || L 0–9 || — || —
|- bgcolor="#ccffcc"
| 33 || March 22 || Texas State || ULM Softball Complex || W 7–4 || — || —
|- bgcolor="#ccffcc"
| 34 || March 25 || Central Arkansas || ULM Softball Complex || W 4–0 || — || —
|- bgcolor="#ccffcc"
| 35 || March 28 ||  || Eagle Field || W 8–6 || — || —
|- bgcolor="#ccffcc"
| 36 || March 29 || @ Georgia Southern || Eagle Field || W 7–5 || — || —
|- bgcolor="#ccffcc"
| 37 || March 29 || @ Georgia Southern || Eagle Field || W 6–0 || — || —
|- bgcolor="#ffcccc"
| 38 || March 31 || @ #1 LSU || Tiger Park || L 3–7 || — || —
|-

|- align="center" bgcolor=""
| 39 || April 3 ||  || Troy Softball Complex || 3:00 pm || — || —
|- align="center" bgcolor=""
| 40 || April 3 || @ Troy || Troy Softball Complex || 5:00 pm || — || —
|- align="center" bgcolor=""
| 41 || April 4 || @ Troy || Troy Softball Complex || 12:00 pm || — || —
|- align="center" bgcolor=""
| 42 || April 8 || @ Louisiana Tech || Lady Techster Softball Complex || 6:00 pm || — || —
|- align="center" bgcolor=""
| 43 || April 11 ||  || ULM Softball Complex || 4:00 pm || — || —
|- align="center" bgcolor=""
| 44 || April 11 || UT–Arlington || ULM Softball Complex || 6:00 pm || — || —
|- align="center" bgcolor=""
| 45 || April 12 || UT–Arlington || ULM Softball Complex || 12:00 pm || — || —
|- align="center" bgcolor=""
| 46 || April 15 ||  || Ladyjack Softball Field || 2:00 pm || — || —
|- align="center" bgcolor=""
| 47 || April 15 || @ Stephen F. Austin || Ladyjack Softball Field || 4:00 pm || — || —
|- align="center" bgcolor=""
| 48 || April 22 ||  || Lady Demon Diamond || 6:00 pm || — || —
|- align="center" bgcolor=""
| 49 || April 25 || @ Georgia State || Robert E. Heck Softball Complex || 2:00 pm || — || —
|- align="center" bgcolor=""
| 50 || April 25 || @ Georgia State || Robert E. Heck Softball Complex || 4:00 pm || — || —
|- align="center" bgcolor=""
| 51 || April 26 || @ Georgia State || Robert E. Heck Softball Complex || 1:00 pm || — || —
|-

|- align="center" bgcolor=""
| 52 || May 2 || UL–Lafayette || ULM Softball Complex || 2:00 pm || — || —
|- align="center" bgcolor=""
| 53 || May 2 || UL–Lafayette || ULM Softball Complex || 4:00 pm || — || —
|- align="center" bgcolor=""
| 54 || May 3 || UL–Lafayette || ULM Softball Complex || 12:00 pm || — || —
|-

|- align="center" bgcolor=""
| 57 || May 6–9 || TBA || San Marcos, TX || — || — || —
|-

|-
|

References

Louisiana–Monroe
Louisiana–Monroe Warhawks softball seasons
Louisiana–Monroe Warhawks softball